The masseteric nerve is a nerve of the face. It is a branch of the mandibular nerve (V3). It crosses the mandibular notch to reach masseter muscle. It supplies the masseter muscle, and gives sensation to the temporomandibular joint. It may be used to compensate for facial nerve paralysis.

Structure 
The masseteric nerve is a branch of the mandibular nerve (V3), itself a branch of the trigeminal nerve. It passes laterally, above the lateral pterygoid muscle, in front of the temporomandibular articulation, and behind the tendon of the temporalis muscle. It crosses the mandibular notch with the masseteric artery. It then reaches the deep surface of the masseter muscle, often branching into 2 or 3 branches. It ramifies nearly as far as the anterior border of the masseter muscle.

Function 
The masseteric nerve supplies the masseter muscle. It gives sensation to the temporomandibular joint.

Clinical significance 
The masseteric nerve may be harvested and used to repair paralysis of the facial nerve.

See also 
 Masseteric artery

References 

Mandibular nerve